Rawaseneng Monastery is a monastery complex of the Catholic Order of Cistercians of the Strict Observance (O.C.S.O.), popularly known as the Trappists, located in Temanggung Regency, Central Java, Indonesia. The monastery was officially established on 1 April 1953 as a daughter house of Koningshoeven Abbey in Tilburg, Netherlands. Apart from being a residence for the monks, there are also a church, prayer garden, retreat houses, coffee plantations, dairy farms along with the processing industries within the monastery complex. Ronald Bell, a pilgrim from the United States, shares his impression about this place, "You will get all the stages, praying, meditating, contemplating sacred readings, and working. All of those constitute an inseparable part of the experience." Not far from the monastery complex, it lies the Church of Santa Maria dan Yoseph as the center of the Rawaseneng Parish, just ahead of the Kindergarten and Elementary School of Fatima Rawaseneng which are managed by the Dominican nuns.

Like the monks in other Trappist monasteries, the monks of Rawaseneng Monastery lives on prayer and works of their hands. The results of their works on coffee plantations, dairy farms, and bakery/cake industries become the main source of livelihood of the monks in the monastery, thus they do not live by relying on contribution from the congregation. In his address during the 60th anniversary celebration of the Rawaseneng Monastery on 25 August 2013, Archbishop Johannes Pujasumarta said, "Together with the nuns of the Trappist Gedono, they present a Church that prays and works in the Archdiocese of Semarang."

Superiors 
Superiors of the community since the official establishment in 1953:
 1953 – 1958 : Bavo van der Ham, OCSO (Superior)
 1958 – 1963 : Bavo van der Ham, OCSO (Titular Prior)
 1963 – 1966 : Frans Harjawiyata, OCSO (Superior ad nutum)
 1966 – 1968 : Willibrord van Dijk, OCSO (Superior ad nutum)
 1968 – 1970 : Bavo van der Ham, OCSO (Superior ad nutum)
 1970 – 1976 : Bavo van der Ham, OCSO (Titular Prior)
 1976 – 1976 : Frans Harjawiyata, OCSO (Superior ad nutum)
 1976 – 1978 : Frans Harjawiyata, OCSO (Titular Prior)
 1978 – 2006 : Frans Harjawiyata, OCSO (Abbot)
 2006 – present : , OCSO (Abbot)

Daughter houses 
Rawaseneng Monastery has founded following daughter houses:
  Bunda Pemersatu Monastery in Weru, Jetak Village, in Getasan, Semarang, Indonesia (nuns)
  Lamanabi Trappist Monastery in Lamanabi Village, Tanjung Bunga, East Flores, Indonesia (monks)
  Trappistine Monastery "Our Lady Star of Hope", Macau (nuns)

Gallery

See also 
 Archdiocese of Semarang
 Enclosed religious orders

References

Bibliography

External links 

 
 Cistercian Order Is Growing in Africa and Asia, ZENIT
 , 16 days as a monk, YouTube
 , Cultural dialogue between Catholic monastery and Muslim community, in Indonesian
 Church of St. Maria & Yusuf, Rawaseneng, Jawa Tengah, pictures of Rawaseneng Parish Church

Rural tourism
Trappist monasteries in Indonesia
1953 establishments in Indonesia